Chrome Matrix is the lesser known debut EP from Australian nu metal band Superheist, released by Cut-Throat / Shock Records in 1997 three years after their first release the Apocalypse demo, of which two hidden songs on the EP originate from.

Track listing

Notes:
Track 3 is a remix of track 1
Track 4 starts at 0:00 and ends at 0:20, followed by 2 minutes and 20 seconds of silence (0:20 - 2:40) and the two hidden songs from Apocalypse demo: the first hidden track starts at 2:40 and the second hidden track starts at 7:23.

Credits 

Superheist
Roderick McLeod - vocals
dw Norton - guitar
Adam Donath - bass guitar
Adam Messenger  - drums
Mark Rachelle - Keyboards

Production
Mark Rachelle - mixing on 1,2,3 and 5
dw Norton - mixing on 4
dw Norton, Roderick McLeod and Mark Rachelle - producer
John Ruberto, Crystal Mastering - mastering

References 

Superheist albums
Shock Records EPs
1997 EPs